Acid Mothers Temple & The Melting Paraiso U.F.O. 2 is a cassette by Acid Mothers Temple & the Melting Paraiso U.F.O. released in February 1997 by the band's own label in a limited edition of 50 copies, along with its companion release Acid Mothers Temple & The Melting Paraiso U.F.O. 1.

The cassette includes some of the first sessions of the band, recorded at Acid Mothers Temple from 1995 to 1997. Most of the songs were later released in different forms on the band's eponymous debut album and other recordings.

The material on the cassette was reissued by Synesthetic Recordings in 2007 as part of the compilation The Early Acid Mothers Temple Recordings 1995-1997.

Track listing

Side A:
 L: "Zen Feedbacker" (Kawabata) / R: "Candy Aum" (Kawabata) – 3:14
 "Pink Lady Lemonade" (Kawabata) – 12:54
 "Tibetan Esoteric Rage" (Kawabata) – 5:44

Side B:
 "Aunt Ema Blues" (Cotton/Kawabata/Suhara) ~ "Glutton For Punishment" (Cotton/Kawabata) – 6:18
 "Rolling Buzz Fuzz Fucker" (Wellens/Kawabata/Suhara) – 5:00
 "Satori LSD" (Kawabata/Higashi/Suhara/Takahashi) – 8:29

Personnel
 Cotton Casino – voices, sitar, synthesizer
 Suhara Keizo – bass
 Koizumi Hajime – drums, percussion, saxophone
 Kawabata Makoto – guitar, synthesizer, sarangi, harmonium, bagpipe, organ, voices, producer, engineer 

Additional personnel
 Momo – bass
 Higashi Hiroshi – guitar
 Takahashi Atsuki – drums
 Yasuda Hisashi – percussion
 Sakakibara Daiji – didgeridoo
 Mano Kazuhiko – saxophone
 Ishida Yoko – violin
 Johan Wellens – cosmic narration

References

Acid Mothers Temple albums
1997 albums